Zabieliškis (formerly) is a village in Kėdainiai district municipality, in Kaunas County, in central Lithuania. According to the 2011 census, the village had a population of 20 people. There are relics of the former Zabieliškis manor. A dump site of "Lifosa" fertilizer factory phosphogypsum waste and a former site of Kėdainiai landfill is located in Zabieliškis.

History

In the end of the 19th century Zabieliškis was an estate, a property of the Stomma family. In the 1970s a part of Zabieliškis village have been merged to Kėdainiai.

Demography

Notable people
Antanas Valionis (born in 1950), Lithuanian politician

Images

References

Villages in Kaunas County
Kėdainiai District Municipality